Fortunato F. Halili National High School is a government-funded college and high school in Barangay Guyong, Santa Maria, Bulacan, Philippines.

High schools in Bulacan
Education in Santa Maria, Bulacan